Crosland Moor and Netherton is an unparished area and a ward in the metropolitan borough of Kirklees, West Yorkshire, England.  It contains 103 listed buildings that are recorded in the National Heritage List for England.

Of these, one is listed at Grade II*, the middle of the three grades, and the others are at Grade II, the lowest grade.  Crosland Moor is a district of the town of Huddersfield, and Netherton is a village to the southwest of the town.  The ward also contains the districts of Beaumont Park, Lockwood and Thornton Lodge, and the village of South Crosland.  The districts of the town are residential, and around the villages are areas of countryside.

Most of the listed buildings are houses and associated structures, farmhouses and farm buildings.  The other listed buildings include churches, chapels and associated structures, cattle troughs and a drinking trough, a pinfold, shops, a hotel, brewery buildings, a mill building and works, a school, milestones, a canal bridge, a well, a former mechanics' institute, and a former town hall.


Key

Buildings

References

Citations

Sources

Lists of listed buildings in West Yorkshire